Dejan Đedović (Serbian : Дејан Ђедовић, born 21 August 1973) is a Serbian futsal coach from Požega, Serbia.

Achievements
2011-2012 All Sports Beirut (Lebanon) Champion
2013-2014 Bank Of Beirut SC ( Lebanon ) Champion 
2014-2015 Bank of Beirut SC ( Lebanon ) Super Cup Winner 
2014-2015 Bank of Beirut SC ( Lebanon ) Champion 
2014-2015 Bank of Beirut SC ( Lebanon ) Cup winner
2015-2016  Bank of Beirut SC ( Lebanon ) Vice Champion 
2015-2016 Bank of Beirut SC ( Lebanon ) Cup winner
2016-2017 Bank of Beirut SC ( Lebanon ) Champion
2017 Bank of Beirut SC ( Lebanon ) Super Cup Winner
2017-2018 Bank of Beirut SC ( Lebanon ) Cup winner
2017-2018 Bank of Beirut SC ( Lebanon ) Champion
2018 AFC Futsal Club Championship 2018 Bank of Beirut SC 3rd place
2019 Tajikistan futsal league Sipar Vice Champion
2021 UAE President cup Al Dhafra vice champion
2021 UAE Futsal league Al Dhafra 
Champion
2021  Al Dhafra UAE futsal SUPER CUP  Winner
2021 Al Dhafra UAE UAE Federation cup Vice Champion

Other activities
2005 to 2008 President Association of Serbian futsal clubs

References
Loznica ceka pojacanja
Djedovic u Loznici
Tajikistan will play friendlies in Thailand and KSA before Afc futsal championship 
Tajikistan qualify for AFC futsal championship 2020 Tajikistan opened second day with victory  Tajikistan won first game
Dejan Djedovic new head coach of Tajikistan national team
Target is to become champion of Tajikistan
2018 AFC futsal club championship Bank of Beirut finish third - "we will back stronger"2014 AFC Futsal Club Championship
AFCInterview for Futsal Focus 
AFC Futsal Club Championship Bank of Beirut dethrone Chonbury

AFC Futsal Club Championship Bank of Beirut - Chonbury

A Historical Triplet for Bank of Beirut SC
Dejan Djedovic  returns to Lebanon
Sporting Braga confirmed participation in Recopa 2008
Bank of Beirut SC - Thai Son Nam 3:3 
Undefeated Champions 
Bank of Beirut Blog 
Press conference Vietnam 2017 
Technical report AFC futsal club championship China 2014
Technical report AFC futsal club championship Iran 2015

1973 births
Sportspeople from Čačak
Futsal coaches
Living people
Serbian men's futsal players
Bjelopavlići
Serbian expatriate sportspeople in the United Arab Emirates
People from Požega, Serbia